André Perugia (1893-1977) was a French shoe designer.  Perugia was born in Nice, France in 1893 of Italian parentage. He trained in his father's workshop and at the age of 16, in 1909, he opened a shop in Paris where he sold handmade shoes. He worked with designers including Paul Poiret, I. Miller, Charles Jourdan, Jacques Fath, Callot Soeurs and Hubert de Givenchy.

He wrote a book From Eve to Rita Hayworth in which he said that the way to unveil a woman's personality was to study her feet. Always eager to experiment with new materials, shapes, and textures, Perugia continued to create shoes of startling originality throughout a 50-year association with I. Miller and then with Charles Jourdan.

References

French fashion designers
Shoe designers
1893 births
1977 deaths